Idre (Elfdalian: Iðer) is a locality and ski resort situated in Älvdalen Municipality, Dalarna County, Sweden with 794 inhabitants in 2010. It was also a historical parish and former municipality.

History
The two parishes Särna and Idre were originally part of Norway but were occupied by an expedition of Swedish peasants from Älvdalen in 1644. The 1645 Treaty of Brömsebro was ambiguous regarding the status of the parishes, but when the exact path of the border was to be decided in 1751 Norway accepted a border west of Idre and Särna.

In 1971 the three municipalities Särna, Idre (which itself had been split off from Särna in 1916) and Älvdalen were amalgamated to form the present municipality of Älvdalen.

See also
Scandinavian Mountains Airport

References

External links

Populated places in Dalarna County
Populated places in Älvdalen Municipality
Ski areas and resorts in Sweden
Former Norwegian populated places